Menat is a commune in the Puy-de-Dôme department in Auvergne-Rhône-Alpes in central France. It is in the heart of the valley of Sioule. 

Its neighboring municipalities are Saint-Éloy-les-Mines, Youx, Moureuille, Servant, Pouzol, Neuf-Église, Ayat-sur-Sioule, and Saint-Rémy-de-Blot.

Locations 
The Menat Abbey (fr) is an abbey in the village of Menat. It is one of the oldest monastic foundations in Auvergne.

The Pont de Menat (fr) is a medieval bridge connecting Menat to adjacent Saint-Rémy-de-Blot.

Gastronomy 
The pâté aux pommes de terre and, the "pain des Combrailles" are specialties of the region.

Fossils 

Menat is the site of a lagerstätte dating to 56 million years ago. Many fossils have been discovered extracted from the shales. A dedicated museum was inaugurated in 1980 and housed in the former abbey castle (now town hall).

Paleocene bird fossils have been discovered in Menat, including Halcyornithidae, Messelasturidae, and relatives of Songziidae.

See also
Communes of the Puy-de-Dôme department

References

Communes of Puy-de-Dôme